Xanthophyllum vitellinum is a plant in the family Polygalaceae. The specific epithet  is from the Latin meaning "egg-yolk yellow", referring to the colour of the flower petals.

Description
The smooth bark is whitish or greyish brown. The flowers are yellow or white, drying orange to dark reddish.

Distribution and habitat
Xanthophyllum vitellinum grows naturally in Thailand and western Malesia. Its habitat is mixed dipterocarp, riverine or lower montane forests from sea-level to  altitude.

References

vitellinum
Flora of Thailand
Flora of Malesia
Plants described in 1840